The Granite City Crossing is a bridge that carries Minnesota State Highway 23 across the Mississippi River in the city of St. Cloud, Minnesota, United States. It was built to replace the DeSoto Bridge in the same location. Construction began in the fall of 2008, after the demolition of the DeSoto Bridge was completed. The bridge opened to traffic on October 29, 2009.

See also
DeSoto Bridge
List of crossings of the Upper Mississippi River

Bridges completed in 2009
Bridges over the Mississippi River
Buildings and structures in St. Cloud, Minnesota
Road bridges in Minnesota
Transportation in Stearns County, Minnesota